Modus may refer to:
 Modus, the Latin name for grammatical mood, in linguistics 
 Modus, the Latin name for mode (statistics)
 Modus (company), an Alberta-based company
 Modus (medieval music), a term used in several different technical meanings in medieval music theory
 The Renault Modus, a small car
 Modus (band), a pop music band in former Czechoslovakia
 Modus (album), 1979, or the title track
 Short for modus decimandi, a type of payment made in lieu of a tithe
 Modus FX, a visual effects company based in Sainte-Thérèse, Quebec, Canada
 Modus (TV series), a Swedish television series, 2015
 "Modus", a song by Joji from his 2020 album Nectar

See also
 Modus operandi
 Modus operandi (disambiguation) 
 Modus vivendi